Turismo Pilipina 2008 is the 1st edition of Turismo Filipina. Its main objective is to encourage Filipinos from different provinces and those Filipinos abroad to rediscover Philippine Tourism. Former Miss International 2005, Lara Quigaman and other Beauty titleholders started this pageant.

Sherylee Sustiguer of Northern Samar was crowned by Miss Earth 2008, Karla Henry as the 1st ever Turismo Pilipina 2008. She will be the country's tourism ambassadress and will represent Philippines in international tourism pageants.

Result

Candidates

Crossovers 
 Grezilda "Adie" Adelantar
 Miss Philippines Earth 2009 (Miss Philippines Eco-Tourism 2009 / 1st Runner-Up)
 Binibining Pilipinas candidate.
 Kimberly Brandon
 Miss Bikini Philippines 2009
 Anna Bautista
 Miss Philippines Earth 2007 (Miss Philippines Eco-Tourism 2007 /4th Runner-up)
 Ana Maria Baladad
 Mutya ng Pilipinas 2009 (Mutya ng Pilipinas – Overseas Communities)
 Christine Barby Loren, Leah Baranasca, Paula Figueras, Jinky Miranda, and Adie Adelantar all competed in Miss Philippines Earth 2009.
 Emmerie Cunanan
 Miss Philippines Earth 2010 (Miss Philippines Water 2010 / 2nd Runner-up)
 Roanne Aguilar
 Binibining Pilipinas 2010 (Top 10)

Beauty pageants in the Philippines